In baseball, a utility player is a player who typically does not have the offensive abilities to justify a regular starting role on the team but is capable of playing more than one defensive position. These players are able to give the various starters a rest, or replace a starter due to injury, or play late in a game to provide improved defense when their team is winning.

Description
Utility infielders typically play both second base and shortstop, sometimes also third base, and more rarely first base. A "fourth outfielder" is likewise an outfielder who can play all three outfield positions but does not have the hitting skills to be a starting player. Some utility players have the defensive ability to play in both the infield and outfield—recent players in Major League Baseball (MLB) fitting this description include Marwin González, Brock Holt, Cory Spangenberg, and Ben Zobrist.

Playing time for fourth outfielders has been called "erratic and unpredictable". Often, fourth outfielders are outfield prospects who have not settled on one outfield position when arriving in the major leagues, veteran players seeking additional playing time to extend their careers, or part-time position players who double as designated hitters.  Often, the fourth outfielder can be a platoon system against certain pitchers;  for example, one outfielder will play only when the starting pitcher is a right-handed pitcher and the other plays only when the starting pitcher is a left-handed pitcher, if one player's performance is better against certain types of pitchers.

Notable utility players

Within MLB, César Tovar, Cookie Rojas, Bert Campaneris, Shane Halter, Don Kelly, Jose Oquendo Scott Sheldon, and Andrew Romine all played every position (including pitcher) during their respective careers, with Tovar, Campaneris, Halter, Sheldon, and Romine all doing it in one game.

Luis Sojo is considered to be the classic modern utility player in baseball, as he was a natural shortstop, but could also play third base, second base, first base, and even left field. It was said that in emergency situations, he could even play a bit of catcher.

In 1991, the Detroit Tigers' Tony Phillips was the first player to start 10 games at five different positions in the same season.

In 2005, Chone Figgins started 48 games at third, 45 in center field and 36 at second, and finished 17th in American League Most Valuable Player balloting.

Second baseman Ben Zobrist of the Chicago Cubs has played first base, second base, third base, shortstop and outfield; José Bautista of the Toronto Blue Jays has played first base, second base, third base, and outfield; and Josh Harrison of the Pittsburgh Pirates has played second base, shortstop, third base, outfield, and pitcher. All three have been named All Stars while playing multiple positions in their All-Star seasons. Zobrist and Bautista both finished in the top 10 in MVP voting while starting at least 40 games at two different defensive positions.

In 2015, Brock Holt of the Boston Red Sox was the first player ever to be selected to the All Star Game after starting at seven or more positions before the All-Star break.

Willians Astudillo of the Minnesota Twins has played every position except for shortstop in his brief major league career, despite having less than a half-season of cumulative experience.

See also
 Two-way player#Baseball

References

Baseball positions